Constance Beresford-Howe (10 November 1922 – 20 January 2016) was a Canadian novelist.

Biography
Constance Beresford-Howe was born in 1922 in Montreal and graduated from McGill University with an BA and MA, and from Brown University, where she completed a Ph.D. in 1950. She taught English literature and creative writing at McGill in Montreal and Ryerson University in Toronto until her retirement in 1988.

Beresford-Howe published ten novels between 1946 and 1991. The Book of Eve (1973), her best-known novel, tells the story of a 65-year-old woman who leaves her demanding husband for the freedom to live the way she wants. The stage version, Eve, by Larry Fineberg, premiered at the Stratford Festival in 1976.

Two of Beresford-Howe's novels, A Population of One and The Marriage Bed, were made into television films for CBC Television.

Bibliography

Novels
The Unreasoning Heart (1946)
Of This Day's Journey (1947)
The Invisible Gate (1949)
Lady Greensleeves (1955)
The Book of Eve (1973)
A Population of One (1976)
The Marriage Bed (1981)
Night Studies (1985)
Prospero's Daughter (1988)
A Serious Widow (1991)

References

1922 births
2016 deaths
Canadian women novelists
20th-century Canadian novelists
McGill University alumni
Brown University alumni
Academic staff of Toronto Metropolitan University
Academic staff of McGill University
Writers from Montreal
20th-century Canadian women writers
Canadian expatriates in the United States